Reginald Herbert Dixon, MBE, ARCM (16 October 1904 – 9 May 1985) was an English theatre organist who was primarily known for his position as organist at the Tower Ballroom, Blackpool, a position he held from March 1930 until March 1970. He made and sold more recordings than any other organist before him, or since. He was in high demand throughout the 1930s, 40s, 50s, 60s and 70s. During his fifty-year career he was one of the top-selling artists, his prolific output ranking alongside that of Victor Silvester and Bing Crosby.

Biography

Early life
Dixon was born in Ecclesall, Sheffield on 16 October 1904. By the age of two, Dixon started to play the organ and piano. Seeing the keen spirit and potential that he possessed for music made his father realise that his son was worthy of tuition. In addition to Dixon's tuition he also practised two hours a day on piano.  By the age of twelve, he was already performing in concerts at local music festivals, and by the age of thirteen, he began taking lessons in organ at his local church. At the age of thirteen, he had to give up his schooling in order to continue his music studies. He was now practising at least 8 hours per day or more. He also had applied for the post of organist at Birley Carr Methodist church and was chosen from several applicants, and was also assistant organist at Hillsborough Methodist church. He enrolled at the University of Sheffield studying counterpoint and harmony, and was awarded Associate of the Royal College of Music (ARCM) when he was 17 years old.

Cinema experience
Dixon auditioned at the Stocksbridge Palace, near Sheffield. The piece he played was Debussy's "Arabesque" and he was employed as pianist and musical director, for the sum of £3 per week. Dixon gained a lot of experience in this job, and greatly enlarged his repertoire and developed his technique further. After eighteen months, Dixon accepted a job as pianist and deputy organist at Chesterfield Picture House, where his wage was £5 a week. To supplement this wage, he was also giving lessons. At Chesterfield he was called upon more and more often to play the organ, and when he was 21, he became a fully professional theatre organist. A year later he became organist and pianist of the Heeley Palace in Sheffield, and was still teaching. For practice he was also playing at the Regent Cinema on a 2/8 Wurlitzer, which he became fond of. He was employed as orchestral organist at the West End cinema in Birmingham, from where he changed over to become organist at the Regent Cinema, in Dudley. Here he played a 2/6 Wurlitzer, and it was while he was here that Dixon was giving lessons to Harry Farmer.

After a time, Dixon left for a job at the New Victoria Cinema in Church Street, Preston, where he played a 2/9 Wurlitzer.

The Tower Ballroom
In March 1930, Dixon was invited to audition for the position of organist at Blackpool's Tower Ballroom, which, at the time, contained a 2/10 Wurlitzer. Previous to this audition, there had been two other organists, Max Bruce and James Hodgetts FRCO. The Wurlitzer's job had been to provide music for dancing, however, and neither organist could tackle the difficult task of keeping a strict tempo.
After auditioning, Dixon was given a trial, with the ultimatum that, if he did not make a success of playing the Wurlitzer for dancing, both he and the Wurlitzer would go. Once he had mastered playing in strict tempo, Dixon further developed his playing style, with a strong bass line, and both hands providing accompaniment and melody. Dixon was mainly left-handed and he often played the accompaniment rhythm with his left hand as well as the melody using second touch. This left his right hand free to supplement the music. This became Dixon's trade mark instantly recognisable style. 
Soon enough, Dixon had fully exploited the 2/10 Wurlitzer's capabilities. Since this was holding him back, and the dancers, this made Dixon plan a larger, more suitable instrument. Within weeks of his appointment at the Tower, the BBC were broadcasting Mr R. H Dixon from the Tower Ballroom, Blackpool. 
One such broadcast was as follows:

"Chromatic Waltz No. 5" (Godard)
"Cheer Up and Smile" – (Conrad)
"Sing, You Sinners" (Sam Coslow)
Falling in Love Again (Hollander)
"When I Passed The Old Church Door" (Nicholls)
"Exactly Like You" Fields
"Gee! But I'd Like to Make You Happy" (Shay and Ward)
"Oh My Maiden, My Maiden" (Lehar)
"Blue is The Night" Fisher

This broadcast was different from any previous organ broadcast, and with Dixon's unique style, nothing like it had been heard before. Dixon was also playing alongside bandleader Bertini in concerts, dance sessions, radio broadcasts and recordings.

By 1931, Dixon's broadcasts were becoming highly popular, and the time slot was expanded from 30 minutes, to 45 minutes, and were made as often as 5 times a week to the UK alone. Regular broadcasts were also being made to the British Empire, and Dixon was often in the ballroom in the very early hours of the morning, broadcasting live to places such as Canada, India, Africa and Australia.

During the winter months, Dixon toured the UK, visiting cinemas and concert halls all over the country. These venues soon filled to capacity, like the Tower Ballroom was daily filled to its capacity of 7,000 people. In 1933 the Daily Mail stated that Dixon was the "most popular of all cinema organists".

In March 1935, the organ which Dixon had longed for was first broadcast. The new 3/13 Wurlitzer was broadcast to the British Empire, and after, the Tower Company was inundated with telephone calls from people giving praise to the new organ, and Dixon's handling of the new instrument.  Later that year, he made a broadcast from Manchester Road Congregational Church, Nelson, with the music of Bach, Handel and Massenet.  The new Wurlitzer was also heavily used in the Tower Company's annual production of Handel's "Messiah" with Dixon at the console.

After a spell away from radio in winter 1938, there was much speculation about Dixon leaving his Tower post to become the new BBC organist, after Reginald Foort had recently resigned from the post. Dixon said to this "I am under contract with the Tower company for another three years and I have also fixed up for a long winter with the Bernstein's Theatres Limited – the Granada theatres. If I had the offer of the job, I do not think I would accept it. I certainly would not take it if the finances were the same as applies to Mr Foort" Later that year, the "Daily Express" voted Dixon as Britain's number-one organist. He came top of a nationwide poll, and had double, or more than double the votes of any other organist.

On 14 July 1939 Dixon, and Horace Finch, gave the first public performance of the new Opera House Wurlitzer, the last new Wurlitzer Organ to come to the UK.

Second World War
In 1940, Dixon joined the R.A.F. During his time there, he was often called upon to entertain service personnel, and was still to be heard on radio occasionally, as well as playing for concerts at the Tower Ballroom. While in the RAF he attained the rank of Flying Officer, and he left the RAF as Squadron Leader.  In 1946, he returned to the tower, and was busier than ever. In addition to his Tower broadcasts, he was also broadcasting from Europe.

1950s
By 1952, Dixon had made over 1,000 broadcasts, and had already made several television appearances. In the later half of 1952, Dixon fell ill, through being overworked and completely exhausted. After a few months, he was back in full health, and returned to the Tower Ballroom. In 1954, he starred in BBC's You're Only Young Once and in 1955, he performed for Queen Elizabeth II, at the console of the 3/13 Wurlitzer of Blackpool's Opera House, for the Royal Variety Performance. After the show, the Queen said to him that she often listened to him on the radio. By now, Dixon had been at the tower, and on radio, for 25 years, and had performed, according to the Empire News, to over 60 million people live at the Tower ballroom alone, and radio listening figures were now topping 6 million for each broadcast he made.

In 1956, he had his own radio show on the BBC called Meet Me at the Tower, which he was joined with guest organist and often by the BBC Northern Dance Orchestra. In addition to this, he still had his normal broadcasts to play for.  In his weekly articles in the "Daily Herald", he had done much speculating as to who would turn on the Blackpool Illuminations that year. The Blackpool Illuminations have been an annual attraction since 1879, and the switch on ceremony was a prestigious event. Up until that time celebrities such as Prince George the Duke of Kent, George Formby, Jacob Malik (Soviet Ambassador), John H. Whitney (U.S. Ambassador), Valerie Hobson and Dame Anna Neagle had all turned on Blackpool's illuminations. Dixon soon found out that it was himself who was to turn on the illuminations that year, and the event was televised to a Europe-wide audience.

In December 1956 a fire, which started in the Tower Lounge Restaurant, spread to the Ballroom. Fortunately the organ survived owing to its position above the proscenium arch, however, the console was badly damaged but was later fixed.  While the Tower ballroom was being restored at the cost of £500,000, Dixon resumed his schedule in the Empress Ballroom, where in 1935, a 3/13 Wurlitzer had been installed. In 1958, he returned to the Tower Ballroom Wurlitzer, and things proceeded as normal, in the newly restored ballroom.

On 3 July 1958, The Bulletin newspaper reported that Dixon was to have an operation that Sunday, quoting him as saying "A nerve in my right elbow is affecting the hand". It was "the result of an injury received in a motorcycle smash when I was a youth." The Bulletin reported that "He wanted to postpone the operation until the end of the season, but doctors have warned him that delay might mean losing the use of the hand".   He returned to the ballroom and its Wurlitzer later in the same month, having made over 2,000 broadcasts.

1960s
In July 1966, the Reading Eagle newspaper of Reading, Pennsylvania, US, reported "There are many places in the U.S where people go to dance to the music of big orchestras, such as the Hollywood Palladium or New York's Roseland Ballroom, but in England, as many as 2,500 dancers and 4,000 spectators on a single evening patronise the Tower Ballroom in Blackpool to hear Reginald Dixon play the organ". In the same year, Dixon was awarded an MBE for his services in entertaining the public and radio listeners the world over. At the ceremony in Buckingham Palace, while pinning on his medal, Queen Elizabeth II said to him, "I have often listened to you, you must have been there [at the Tower Ballroom] for a long time now". Dixon replied, "Yes ma'am. I have been there since March 1930, but it does not seem as long as that".

In 1969, he was also awarded by the BBC for the years of pleasure he had given to millions. The same year, Dixon announced his retirement from his Tower Ballroom post in order to spend more time with his family.

At the end of the season, Dixon retired from playing for dancing at the Ballroom, but continued to play for Sunday concerts as normal. It was on 29 March (Easter Sunday) 1970 that he gave his final concert on the Tower Ballroom Wurlitzer, an event which was recorded and broadcast by the BBC, and he was also interviewed by Robin Richmond for the BBC's The Organist Entertains.

Retirement
Dixon's retirement from the Tower did not mean retirement altogether. He was still broadcasting to a very large audience, and he was also on tour across the UK and Europe, fulfilling engagements with various organ societies and clubs, determined to see the organ's survival. While in the Netherlands, he was also on radio and TV, as well as making a new LP. In addition, he had requests from both the US and Australia to conduct tours.

He died on 9 May 1985 in Blackpool, aged 80. He was cremated at Carleton Crematorium, Blackpool.

Discography 
Between 1932 and 1958, Reginald Dixon released some 296 records on 78rpm discs which the table below lists. It does not include releases on 45rpm, 33⅓rpm or cassette releases.

Release year is listed month/year.

References

1904 births
1985 deaths
English organists
British male organists
Fellows of the Royal College of Organists
Members of the Order of the British Empire
Musicians from Sheffield
Royal Air Force officers
Theatre organists
20th-century English musicians
20th-century organists
20th-century British male musicians
People from Ecclesall
Alumni of the University of Sheffield
Associates of the Royal College of Music